Jakimowice  is a village in the administrative district of Gmina Radoszyce, within Końskie County, Świętokrzyskie Voivodeship, in south-central Poland.

The village has a population of 530.

References

Jakimowice